Horda is a locality situated in Värnamo Municipality, Jönköping County, Sweden with 377 inhabitants in 2010.

Notable people
Alice Bah Kuhnke - Member of the European Parliament

References 

Populated places in Jönköping County
Populated places in Värnamo Municipality
Finnveden